La braise (English: The Ember) is a 1982 Moroccan film directed by Farida Bourquia in her directorial debut. It was one of only two feature films made in Morocco by female directors in the 1980s, and is considered to be one of the first Moroccan feature films directed by a woman.

Synopsis 
In a mountain village, a father is accused of having raped and killed a local young woman. He is lynched by the villagers, and his wife dies tragically. They leave behind three persecuted children — Ali, Maryem, and Brahim — who attempt to uncover the perpetrator of the crime of which their father had been wrongly accused.

References

1982 films
Moroccan drama films
1982 drama films